École Mission Secondary School is a high school located in Mission, British Columbia, Canada. It was established in 1952, and is the longest serving secondary school in the District of Mission. During 2014 the local school district decided that Mission Secondary would be the one and only high school in Mission starting during the 2015–2016 school year with Jim Pearce (from Heritage Park Secondary School) as the new principal.

References

High schools in British Columbia
Mission, British Columbia
Educational institutions established in 1952
1952 establishments in British Columbia